Strandby railway station is a railway station serving the small coastal town of Strandby in Vendsyssel, Denmark.

The station is located on the Skagensbanen railway line from Skagen to Frederikshavn, between Rimmen halt and Frederikshavn station. The train services are currently operated by Nordjyske Jernbaner which run frequent local train services between Skagen station and Frederikshavn station.

History 

The station opened in 1924 when  the track gauge of Skagensbanen was converted from narrow gauge to standard gauge. As part of the conversion, the right-of-way between Frederikshavn and Rimmen was changed so the railway line passed by Strandby instead of Elling.

Architecture 
The station building was built in 1922 after designs by the architect Ulrik Plesner. In 2006 the station was renovated with new platforms and a new shelter.

Services 
The train services are currently operated by Nordjyske Jernbaner which run frequent local train services between Skagen and Frederikshavn with onward connections to the rest of Denmark.

References

External links

 Nordjyske Jernbaner – Danish railway company operating in North Jutland Region
 Danske Jernbaner – website with information on railway history in Denmark
 Nordjyllands Jernbaner – website with information on railway history in North Jutland

Railway stations in the North Jutland Region
Railway stations opened in 1924
Ulrik Plesner railway stations
Railway stations in Denmark opened in the 20th century